Felimida paulomarcioi is a species of sea slug, dorid nudibranch, a marine gastropod mollusk in the family Chromodorididae.

The specific name paulomarcioi is in honour of Brazilian malacologist Paulo Marcio Costa.

Distribution
This species was described from Cabo Frio, Brazil.

Ecology 
Prey of Felimida paulomarcioi include sponges Darwinella sp. and Amphimedon viridis.

References

Chromodorididae
Gastropods described in 2006